Calland may refer to:

 Albert Calland (born 1952), United States Navy
 Albert Calland (footballer) (born 1929), English professional footballer
 Frederic Calland Williams (1911–1977), English engineer
 Lee Calland (born 1941), NFL football player
 Leo Calland (1901–1984), American football and basketball player and coach
 Matt Calland (born 1971), head coach at Halifax RLFC
 Ralph Calland (1916–2005), English professional footballer
 Ted Calland (1932–1995), English professional footballer